Sir Allan Wolsey Cardinall, KBE, CMG  (21 March 1887 – 26 January 1956) was a British colonial administrator. He was Governor of the Falkland Islands from 1941 to 1946.

References 

1887 births
1956 deaths
Governors of the Falkland Islands
Place of birth missing
Knights Commander of the Order of the British Empire
Companions of the Order of St Michael and St George